Škrjančevo is a settlement on the left bank of the Kamnik Bistrica River south of Radomlje in the Municipality of Domžale in the Upper Carniola region of Slovenia.

References

External links

Škrjančevo on Geopedia

Populated places in the Municipality of Domžale